Attorney General Law may refer to:

Edward Law, 1st Baron Ellenborough (1750–1818), Attorney General for England and Wales
Hugh Law (1818–1883), Attorney General for Ireland

See also
General Law (disambiguation)